Cory or Corrie Morgan may refer to:

 Cory Morgan (blogger) (born 1971), Canadian blogger and political candidate
 Cory Morgan (ice hockey) (born 1978), Canadian ice hockey player
 Corey Morgan, see Fight Night Champion